The Calais border barrier is an international border barrier under construction jointly by France and the United Kingdom designed to prevent illegal migrants from gaining access to the Channel Tunnel and from the port of Calais as a means of illegal entry to Britain.   Construction, funded by Britain, began in September 2016.

It aims, in particular, to prevent migrants from entering Britain by stowing away on trucks and ferry boats.  The wall will cut the large migrant encampment known as the Calais Jungle off from access to the port and tunnel entrance.  The government of Calais opposes construction of the wall, preferring that the central government instead dismantle the Jungle because the illegal migrants living there place a strain on local resources.

The $23 million cost will be shared by Britain and France.

See also
France–UK border
Border barrier for a list of border barriers
Norway–Russia border
Austrian border barrier
Bulgarian border barrier
Greek border barrier
Hungarian border barrier
Macedonian border barrier
Slovenian border barrier
Removal of Hungary's border fence with Austria
Russia–Ukraine barrier

References

Border barriers constructed during the European migrant crisis
France–United Kingdom border
Calais migrant crisis (1999–present)